Harry Joseph Ebding (September 12, 1906 – September 11, 1980) was a professional American football End in the National Football League (NFL). He played seven seasons for the Portsmouth Spartans (1931–1933) and the Detroit Lions (1934–1937). He was named All-Pro in 1933.

References

1906 births
1980 deaths
American football ends
Detroit Lions players
Portsmouth Spartans players
Saint Mary's Gaels football players
Sportspeople from Walla Walla, Washington
Players of American football from Washington (state)